Fanindra Nath Bose (2 March 1888 – 1 August 1926) was a Bengal-born sculptor known for his small works in bronze. He worked in Scotland and for sometime was appointed sculptor to the Gaekwar Maharaja Sayajirao III of Baroda.

Life and work 
Bose was born in Bohor, Vikrampura, Bengal, son of Babu Taranath Bose. He joined the Jubilee Art Academy and then went to the Government School of Art at Calcutta where he studied under E.B. Havell. He then moved to England and joined the Royal Institution at Edinburgh. He joined the Edinburgh College of Art in 1909 studying under Percy Portsmouth and received a diploma in 1911. A travel scholarship of £100 allowed him to study in Paris under Auguste Rodin and M.J.A. Mercie. He returned to Scotland and set up a studio in Edinburgh, exhibiting first at the Royal Scottish Academy in 1913 two statuettes "The Boy and the Crab" and "The Hunter". The second caught the attention of the Maharaja of Gaekwar who had another copy made for him apart from several other commissions for the Laxmi Vilas Palace and Gardens. The original was bought by Sir William Gascombe John. He visited Baroda briefly and taught sculpture at the Kala Bhavan. Other sculptures by Bose are at the War Memorial, East Lothian, and St. Johns Church, Perth. He was the first Indian member of the Royal Scottish Academy, elected in 1925.

In India, the Modern Review of May 1921 carried a review of his work by Ordhendra Coomar Gangoly under the pen name of "Agastya" who criticized, like nationalists of the period, that Bose's work was "un-Indian".

Personal life
Bose married Mary (or Molly) Ferguson and ran his Dean Studio at 4 Belford Road, Edinburgh.

Death
On 1 August 1926, Bose drowned while angling in a loch near Peebles. He was 38.

References

External links 

 Biographical notes
 Note on Fanindra Bose
 Boy in Pain
 Art UK
 Biography

1888 births
1926 deaths
Indian sculptors
Royal Scottish Academicians
British India emigrants to the United Kingdom
Deaths by drowning in the United Kingdom